Francisca Moroso Velasco (born 20 March 1993) is a former Chilean footballer who plays as a forward. She has been a member of the Chile women's national team.

Club career
After spending her first years playing in Chile, in 2018, Moroso moved for signing with Spanish team CFF Cáceres.

On 20 September 2019, Moroso agreed terms with Segunda División team Sporting de Gijón. However, on 8 November 2019, the club and the player parted ways due to personal reasons.

International career
Moroso has represented Chile at the 2010 FIFA U-17 Women's World Cup. At senior level, she played the 2013 International Women's Football Tournament of Brasília, the 2014 South American Games and the 2014 Copa América Femenina.

Retirement 
Moroso announced that she retired from football through her social media on 25 Oct, 2021.

References

External links

1993 births
Living people
Women's association football forwards
Chilean women's footballers
Chile women's international footballers
South American Games silver medalists for Chile
South American Games medalists in football
Competitors at the 2014 South American Games
Club Deportivo Universidad Católica footballers
Colo-Colo (women) footballers
Universidad de Chile footballers
Segunda Federación (women) players
Sporting de Gijón (women) players
Chilean expatriate women's footballers
Chilean expatriate sportspeople in Spain
Expatriate women's footballers in Spain
20th-century Chilean women
21st-century Chilean women